The Ferrara Synagogue is a synagogue located in Ferrara, Italy.

The synagogue is the only surviving representative of the several synagogues that once flourished in Ferrara. It is located in the historic Jewish community building of 1421 at 95 via Mazzini, which once housed two other synagogues, destroyed by fascists during World War II. Other synagogues were once located nearby. The building also houses a Jewish museum.

Synagogue

The surviving synagogue, the Scola Tedesca, German Synagogue, is a large room with a women's gallery upstairs. The barrel-vaulted ceiling and walls are decorated in the Regency/Empire style fashionable when the room was renovated in 1820. The plaster designs on the walls are the work of Gaetano Davia, designer of the interior design of the Ferrara City Theater, Teatro Comunale. They feature Jewish motifs such as the Torah ark carried by the Jews during their Exodus from Egypt, and the vestments of the High Priest in the Temple at Jerusalem. The synagogue retains its 18th-century bimah and Torah ark in dark wood, set off by a white marble balustrade.

Jewish museum

The museum displays the Torah Ark of the Scola Italiana, Italian rite synagogue, once located in a large room in the same building. The room, now in use as a lecture hall, retains its original, vaulted, Baroque ceiling. Other furnishing were destroyed in a fascist attack on the building. The museum also displays several Torah arks from former synagogues in small towns in the region.

Among the artifacts are an eighteenth-century contract between a local Jewish family and a newly hired nursemaid in which the nursemaid undertakes not to baptize the Jewish baby, and a stamp used to seal Jewish graves to prevent medical students at the university from using the cadavers for dissection practice.

References

External links
 Current community website

Synagogues in Italy
Jewish museums in Italy
Regency and Biedermeier synagogues
Buildings and structures in Ferrara
Museums in Ferrara